Estadio Juan Demóstenes Arosemena  is a 7,000 seats baseball field in Panama City, Panama.  It hosts mainly baseball games and is the home stadium of Panamá Metro of the Panamanian Professional Baseball League.  It also served as host for the 1938 Central American and Caribbean Games.  The stadium was opened in 1938 and has a seating capacity of 25,000 spectators.

References

Baseball venues in Panama
Sports venues in Panama City